John Norris (by 1502 – 30 January 1577) was an English politician.

He was a Member (MP) of the Parliament of England for Downton in October 1553 and April 1554, for Taunton in November 1554, and for Bodmin in 1558.

References

1577 deaths
English MPs 1553 (Mary I)
English MPs 1554
English MPs 1554–1555
English MPs 1558
Members of the pre-1707 English Parliament for constituencies in Cornwall
Year of birth uncertain